The following lists events that happened during 1895 in Australia.

Incumbents

Premiers
Premier of New South Wales was George Reid
Premier of South Australia was Charles Kingston
Premier of Queensland was Hugh Nelson
Premier of Tasmania was Edward Braddon
Premier of Western Australia was John Forrest
Premier of Victoria was George Turner

Governors
Governor of New South Wales – Robert Duff until 21 March, then Henry Brand, 2nd Viscount Hampden
Governor of Queensland – Henry Wylie Norman until 31 December
Governor of South Australia – Algernon Keith-Falconer, 9th Earl of Kintore until 10 April, then Sir Thomas Buxton, 3rd Baronet
Governor of Tasmania – Jenico Preston, 14th Viscount Gormanston
Governor of Victoria – John Hope, 1st Marquess of Linlithgow until 12 July, then Thomas Brassey, 1st Earl Brassey
Governor of Western Australia – William C. F. Robinson until 22 December, then Gerard Smith

Events
 8 August - The steamship SS Catterthun strikes Seal Rocks, NSW, and founders, killing 55 persons
 17 August - The Albert Railway Bridge opens in Brisbane
 10 December - Launceston, Tasmania becomes the first Australian city to be powered by hydro-electricity with the opening of the Duck Reach Power Station

Arts and literature

 6 April - The song Waltzing Matilda is first performed at the North Gregory Hotel, Winton, Queensland.
 Banjo Paterson publishes his first major collection of poetry, The Man from Snowy River and Other Verses
 Tom Roberts painted Bailed Up
 Little Donah Polka published under the name 'Ansell Hope' (unidentified) 
Reverend Alfred Wheeler (composer) publishes Sailing Together

Sport
 Auraria wins the Melbourne Cup
 Victoria wins the Sheffield Shield

Births
 6 January – Hudson Fysh, aviator, joint founder of Qantas (d. 1974)
 14 March – Duncan Thompson, rugby league footballer, coach and administrator (d. 1980)
 13 April – Ivan Stedman, swimmer (d. 1979)
 31 October – Les Darcy, boxer (d. 1917)

Deaths
 29 December – Arthur Sidney Olliff, taxonomist (born in the United Kingdom) (b. 1865)

References

 
Australia
Years of the 19th century in Australia